Mirza Dara Bakht Miran Shah Bahadur (1790 - 8 February 1849) was the eldest son of Emperor Bahadur Shah Zafar. He was the crown Prince of the Mughal Empire from 1837 to 1849. He highly influenced his aged father's decisions and was favoured by every one at the court, including his charismatic  stepmother Begum Zeenat Mahal. His death in 1849 triggered rivalry for heirdom between Mirza Fath-ul-Mulk Bahadur and Mirza Jawan Bakht, son of Begum Zeenat Mahal.

Sources

Mughal princes
1790 births
1849 deaths
Timurid dynasty
Heirs apparent who never acceded